Rosehill may refer to:

Places

Australia 
 Rosehill, New South Wales, in Sydney, Australia

Canada
 Rosehill, Ontario, a neighborhood in Caledon, Ontario
 Rosehill, Toronto, a neighborhood in the Toronto-St. Paul electoral district

Ireland 
 Rosehill, Templeport, a townland in County Cavan, Ireland

New Zealand 
 Rosehill, New Zealand, a suburb of Auckland

United Kingdom 
 Rosehill, Aberdeenshire, an area of Aberdeen, Scotland
 Rosehill, Cornwall
 Rosehill, Greater Manchester, England, a U.K. location
 Rosehill, Lancashire, England, a U.K. location
 Rosehill, London
 Rosehill, North Tyneside, England, a U.K. location
 Rosehill, Pembrokeshire, Wales, a U.K. location
 Rosehill, Shropshire, a U.K. location
 Rosehill Quarry Community Park, Swansea, Wales
 Rosehill, Wrexham, Wales

United States 
 Rosehill Cemetery, Chicago, Illinois
 Rosehill (Gambrills, Maryland), a historic home on the National Register in Anne Arundel County, Maryland
 Rosehill, Mississippi, Marion County, Mississippi
 Rosehill, Philadelphia, a place in Pennsylvania

Other uses
 Rosehill (elm hybrid) (Ulmus × intermedia Rosehill)
 Jay Rosehill (born 1985), professional ice hockey player
 SS Rosehill, a 1911 English steam cargo ship

See also
 Rose Hill (disambiguation)